Mathias Wittek (born Maciej Witek on 30 March 1989) is a Polish-born German professional footballer who most recently played as a defender for Darmstadt 98.

References

External links

1988 births
Living people
People from Kędzierzyn-Koźle
Association football defenders
German footballers
Germany youth international footballers
Polish footballers
German people of Polish descent
TSV 1860 Munich II players
TSV 1860 Munich players
FC Ingolstadt 04 players
1. FC Heidenheim players
SV Darmstadt 98 players
2. Bundesliga players
3. Liga players
Naturalized citizens of Germany